Andrew Blum is an American author and journalist. He writes about architecture, design, technology, urbanism, art, and travel. His writings have been published in various mainstream magazines such as Wired; Newsweek; the Wall Street Journal; the New Yorker; the New York Times; Vanity Fair; BusinessWeek; Slate; and Popular Science.

Early life
He was born in New York City. He received a degree in literature from Amherst College and another in human geography from the University of Toronto.

Works
 Tubes: A Journey to the Center of the Internet (2012)
The Weather Machine: A Journey Inside the Forecast (2019)

References

External links
 

Year of birth missing (living people)
Living people
American male non-fiction writers
American male journalists
Amherst College alumni
University of Toronto alumni